Karnatak University  is a public state university in Dharwad district of Karnataka state, India. The university is recognized by University Grants Commission and accredited by National Assessment and Accreditation Council (NAAC). The university has been awarded 'Grade A' in 2022 by the NAAC for the fourth time.
Karnatak University was granted 'University with potential for Excellence' status by the University Grants Commission.

History
 
The Bombay legislature of the erstwhile Bombay Presidency established Karnatak University through the Karnatak University Act 1949. It became a statutory University on 1 March 1950.

Academics
Karnatak University is spread over 888 acres with faculties of Arts, Commerce, Education, Law, Management, Science and Technology and Social Sciences. The university has over 47 Postgraduate Departments, 224 faculty staff and 4500 students and offers over 42 Doctoral programmes.

Affiliated Colleges
Karnatak University has 5 constituent colleges offering Undergraduate and Postgraduate courses in science, arts, commerce, fine arts, law and education. Karnatak University also has more than 200 colleges affiliated to it.

Post-Graduate Centers
Karnatak university has 3 Post-Graduate centers. These centers are self-contained and cater to the needs of local people as well as promote specialized studies. Following are the post-graduate centers of Karnatak University:
Karwar
Haveri
Gadag

Notable alumni
 

 J. Alexander IAS, Former chief secretary of Karnataka state government
 K. S. Amur, Indian mathematician
 Chandra Arya, Canadian politician
 B. R. Bhat, Indian statistician
 Sucheta Dalal, Indian business journalist and author.
 D. V. Guruprasad, retired Director General of Police, writer in English and Kannada languages.
 Suresh Heblikar, Kannada cinema actor, director and environmentalist
 S. R. Hiremath, Indian activist
 Narayan Sadashiv Hosmane, Indian academic
 Ramachandra S. Hosmane, chemist, professor, researcher
 Ramakrishna V. Hosur, biophysical scientist, professor
 Pankaj Jain, professor of religious studies, film studies, and sustainability
 Jayanth Kaikini, Indian poet, storyteller and lyricist working in Kannada literature and Kannada cinema
 Shashikala Kakodkar, former Chief minister of Goa, Daman and Diu.
 Chandrashekhara Kambara, Kannada poet
 Girish Karnad, Indian actor, film director, Kannada writer, playwright and Rhodes Scholar
 Vivek Kulkarni, Indian businessman
 Ananth Kumar, former Minister of Parliamentary Affairs
 Sudha Murty, Indian writer, philanthropist
 Siddu Nyamagouda, former politician
 Ramdas Pai, Manipal Education and Medical Group
 T. M. A. Pai, Indian doctor, educationist, banker and philanthropist
 A. R. D. Prasad, Indian academic
 V. C. Sajjanar, Indian Police Service officer (1996 batch)
 E. Sampathkumar, professor emeritus of graph theory
 Meka Srikanth, Telugu actor
 Varkey Vithayathil, Catholic cardinal

References

External links 

 

 
Universities and colleges in Hubli-Dharwad
Universities and colleges in Dharwad
Central universities in India
1949 establishments in India
Educational institutions established in 1949
Universities in Karnataka